The sixth and final season of the American television drama series The Americans, comprising 10 episodes, premiered on FX on March 28, 2018, The final season was announced in May 2016, when the series received a two-season renewal to conclude the series. The series moved back to its original time slot, Wednesdays at 10:00pm, after airing on Tuesdays the previous season.

The events of the sixth season begin in late September 1987, three years after the conclusion of season five. The work of American artist Alyssa Monks was used as the artwork of Miriam Shor's character Erica Haskard, including a small number of pieces created just for the series.

The final season received critical acclaim and it was named one of the best television series of 2018 by several publications. It won several awards, including the Golden Globe Award for Best Television Series – Drama, the Critics' Choice Television Award for Best Drama Series, the TCA Award for Outstanding Achievement in Drama, and the Writers Guild of America Award for Television: Dramatic Series.

Cast

Main
 Keri Russell as Elizabeth Jennings, a KGB officer
 Matthew Rhys as Philip Jennings, a retired KGB officer
 Brandon J. Dirden as FBI agent Dennis Aderholt
 Costa Ronin as Oleg Igorevich Burov, a former KGB officer, now at the Soviet transport ministry
 Keidrich Sellati as Henry Jennings, Elizabeth and Philip's son
 Holly Taylor as Paige Jennings, Elizabeth and Philip's daughter
 Margo Martindale as Claudia, Elizabeth's KGB handler
 Noah Emmerich as FBI agent Stan Beeman

Recurring
 Lev Gorn as Arkady Ivanovich Zotov, Directorate S deputy chief
 Laurie Holden as Renee, Stan's wife
 Scott Cohen as Glenn Haskard, a member of a State Department negotiating team
 Miriam Shor as Erica Haskard, an artist and Glenn's bedridden and dying wife
 Alex Feldman as Fyodor Nesterenko, a member of a Soviet negotiating team
 Julia Garner as Kimberly "Kimmy" Breland, daughter of the head of the CIA's Soviet desk
 Amy Tribbey as Marilyn, a KGB agent who works with Elizabeth
 Darya Ekamasova as Sofia Kovalenko Bystrova, a TASS employee
 Yuri Kolokolnikov as Gennadi Bystrov, a Soviet courier and Sofia's husband
 Vera Cherny as Tatiana Evgenyevna Vyazemtseva, a KGB officer working at the Rezidentura
 Kelly AuCoin as Pastor Tim, Paige's former minister, now with the World Council of Churches
 Peter Jacobson as Agent Wolfe, former head of FBI counterintelligence
 Konstantin Lavysh as Father Andrei, a Russian Orthodox priest

Special appearance by
 Derek Luke as Gregory Thomas, an American militant and Elizabeth's ex-lover, who appears in a dream Elizabeth has in the series finale.

Episodes

Reception

Critical response
The sixth season has received widespread acclaim from critics. On Rotten Tomatoes, it received a 99% approval rating with an average score of 9.17/10 based on 30 reviews, with a critics consensus of: "The Americans powerful final season pumps up the volume on an already intense show, concluding the complex series arc with epic familial conflict... and a high body count." On Metacritic, the season has a score of 92 out of 100 based on 18 reviews, indicating "universal acclaim".

Daniel D'Addario of Time wrote of the season: "Happily, the show has evolved in how it deals with its central concerns. [...] Even at its less-well-loved moments, The Americans is still better than practically anything else around." Tim Goodman for The Hollywood Reporter shared similar praise, writing of the final episodes: "They were, all three [episodes] of them, exceptional—clear examples of one of television's greatest dramas still very much on top of its game."

Accolades
At the 70th Primetime Emmy Awards, it won two awards and was nominated for another two. Matthew Rhys won for Outstanding Lead Actor in a Drama Series and Joel Fields and Joe Weisberg won for Outstanding Writing for a Drama Series for the episode "START". It received a nomination for Outstanding Drama Series and Keri Russell was nominated for Outstanding Lead Actress in a Drama Series.

For the 34th TCA Awards, The Americans won for Program of the Year and Outstanding Achievement in Drama, with Russell winning for Individual Achievement in Drama, and Rhys receiving a nomination in that same category. The Americans was named one of the top 10 television programs of the year by the American Film Institute. For the 76th Golden Globe Awards, The Americans won for Best Television Series – Drama, and Rhys and Russell received nominations for Best Actor and Best Actress in a television series drama, respectively.

For the 9th Critics' Choice Television Awards, The Americans won for Best Drama Series, Rhys won for Best Actor in a Drama Series and Noah Emmerich won for Best Supporting Actor in a Drama Series; Russell was nominated for Best Actress in a Drama Series and Holly Taylor was nominated for Best Supporting Actress in a Drama Series. The Americans is nominated for Best Drama Series for the 71st Writers Guild of America Awards.

The series won the Writers Guild of America Award for Television: Dramatic Series at the 71st Writers Guild of America Awards.

References

External links
 
 

2018 American television seasons
Season 6
Television series set in 1987